Pishuinco is a hamlet in the commune of Valdivia, Chile. It lies at the northern end of the Calle-Calle River between the city of Valdivia and Antilhue.

Geography of Los Ríos Region
Hamlets in Chile
Populated places in Valdivia Province